Gianfranco Oradini (born 20 June 1952 is a sailor from Italy, who represented his country at the 1976 Summer Olympics in Kingston, Ontario, Canada as crew member in the Soling. With helmsman Fabio Albarelli and fellow crew member Leopoldo Di Martino they took the 15th place.

Sources
 

Living people
1952 births
Sailors at the 1976 Summer Olympics – Soling
Olympic sailors of Italy
Italian male sailors (sport)